Spintherophyta festiva is a species of leaf beetle native to Mexico.

References 

Eumolpinae
Beetles of North America
Beetles described in 1877
Taxa named by Édouard Lefèvre